, real name , was a Japanese actress.

Background
In May 2009, she became the first actor in Japan to have performed the stage play  2,000 times. She was born in Kyoto, Japan.

On May 11, 2009, Takeo Kawamura announced that Mori would be awarded the People's Honour Award.

Mori died on November 10, 2012, at a hospital in Tokyo, aged 92.

Filmography

Film
Lost Spring (1967) – Hatsu
Scattered Clouds (1967)
Princess Mononoke (1997) – Hii-sama (voice)
Sennen no Koi Story of Genji (2001) – Sei Shōnagon

Television drama
Onna tachi no Hyakuman goku (1988) – Maeda Matsu
Nene: Onna Taikōki (2009)

Dubbing

Live-action
Murder, She Wrote – Jessica Fletcher (Angela Lansbury)

Animation
Brother Bear – Tanana

Honours
Medal with Purple Ribbon (1984)
Order of the Sacred Treasure, 3rd class, Gold Rays with Neck Ribbon (1992)
Person of Cultural Merit (1998)
Order of Culture (2005)
People's Honour Award (2009)
Junior Third Rank (2012; posthumous)

Tribute
On July 1, 2021, Google celebrated her with a Google Doodle.

References

External links

1920 births
2012 deaths
Japanese actresses
People from Kyoto
People's Honour Award winners
Recipients of the Order of Culture
Recipients of the Medal with Purple Ribbon
Persons of Cultural Merit